The Mjosund Bridge is a cantilever bridge that crosses the Mjosundet strait between the islands of Rottøya and Ertvågsøya in the municipality of Aure in Møre og Romsdal county, Norway. Along with the Aursund Bridge, it is part of the road connection between the mainland and Ertvågsøya.

See also
List of bridges in Norway
List of bridges in Norway by length
List of bridges
List of bridges by length

References

Bridges in Møre og Romsdal
Aure, Norway